Kevin Noel Jarre (August 6, 1954 – April 3, 2011) was an American screenwriter, actor, and film producer. He adopted the last name of his adoptive father, Maurice Jarre.

Background and personal life
Jarre was born on August 6, 1954, in Detroit, Michigan, to actress Laura Devon and her second husband, Cleland B. Clark. After his parents' divorced, he lived in Wyoming for a time with his father, whom he referred to as Hemingwayesque, and who had combined ranching and fashion photography. He then returned to Los Angeles with his mother, who was married at that time to actor Brian Kelly. In the mid-1960s, Devon subsequently married French composer Maurice Jarre, who adopted Kevin.

He was the step-brother of Jean-Michel Jarre and Stéfanie Jarre.

In the early 1990s, he had dated actress Lisa Zane; he had written the role of Josephine Marcus in Tombstone with her in mind.

On July 25, 2009, Jarre was arrested in Santa Monica for driving while intoxicated, his bail was set at $5,000.

Career
In the 1960s, Jarre had small acting parts in the TV series Flipper. In England, while his father was scoring the film Ryan's Daughter, Kevin became a friend of writer/director David Lean, who encouraged him to take up screenwriting and directing, giving him the books James Boswell's Life of Johnson and Alan Moorehead's The Blue Nile and The White Nile. One of his early scripts was an unproduced screenplay he had written called Eternal War, which was sent to producer Paul Kohner. In the 1980s, he had written a story treatment that eventually became Rambo: First Blood Part II (1985), as Jarre later recalled in an interview in the documentary Tinsel - The Lost Movie About Hollywood:

Jarre also wrote the screenplays for The Mummy (1999) and The Devil's Own (1997).

Jarre often worked as a script doctor, rewriting scripts, such as the 1990 movie, Navy Seals., the 2004 movie, The Alamo., Track Down, an unproduced screenplay written by Ron Mita and Jim McClain., and the 1997 movie The Jackal (in which Jarre served as a producer), among other films.

In addition to his produced work, Jarre was considered for, or had written several scripts that were never produced, such as a movie about the Hell's Angels that would've been directed by Steve De Jarnatt and starred Mickey Rourke, an adaptation of Bram Stoker's Dracula, a film about the life and times of Wild Bill Hickok that he would've directed, a remake of The Magnificent Seven, a screenplay called Golden Gate Iron that he co-wrote with Derick Martini, two screenplays titled Dead of Summer, and Father and Son (Valhalla's Wake), a Civil War suspense story about Ward Hill Lamon, the friend and bodyguard of U.S. President Abraham Lincoln, a script idea called Hot Springs, and Blood Mark, a screenplay co-written with Desmond Nakano.

He began directing Tombstone (1993) from his own screenplay but he was fired a month into shooting and replaced by George P. Cosmatos. Jarre's scenes featuring Charlton Heston are still featured in the finished film.

He had a role in the short A Hero of Our Time (1985), directed by Michael Almereyda and based on Mikhail Lermontov's novel of the same title, and screened in the 1992 Sundance Film Festival. He also appeared in the film Gotham, the only movie directed by Lloyd Fonvielle.

He had a profound interest in history since childhood. He was especially fascinated by the American Civil War, which led to his in-depth research of the 54th Massachusetts Regiment which inspired his screenplay for Glory (1989). He played a bit part as a quarrelsome soldier who picks a fight and later, as the 54th regiment heads for battle, yells, "Give 'em hell, 54th!" For his work on Glory, he was nominated for a Golden Globe Award for Best Screenplay and a WGA Award for Best Adapted Screenplay.

The screenplays of The Devil's Own and Tombstone were published as novels in 1997 and 1994 respectively.

Death
Jarre died on April 3, 2011, in Santa Monica, California, of heart failure, at the age of 56.

Filmography

References

External links

Glory Screenwriter Kevin Jarre Dies
Kevin Jarre @thetvdb.com

1954 births
2011 deaths
Film producers from Michigan
American male screenwriters
Burials at Westwood Village Memorial Park Cemetery
Male actors from Detroit
Screenwriters from Michigan